The Battle of Sandwich was a naval battle that occurred in 851 between the West Saxons led by Æthelstan and the Danish Vikings. It resulted in a West Saxon victory.

The most important source of information comes from the Anglo-Saxon Chronicle which recorded that:

"...And the same year king Athelstan and Elchere the ealdormen fought on shipboard, and slew a great number of the enemy at Sandwich in Kent, and took nine ships, and put the others to flight; and the heathen men, for the first time, remained over winter in Thanet."

References

9th century in England
Sandwich
851
Sandwich